These are the international rankings of Cameroon

Economy

 World Economic Forum Global Competitiveness Report 2014-2015  ranked 116 out of 144

Government 

Press Freedom Index 2014  ranked  131 out of 180
Transparency International Corruption Perceptions Index 2014  ranked   136 out of 175

Military 

Institute for Economics and Peace  Global Peace Index 2014 ranked 113 out of 162

References

Cameroon